Antena 3 Radio was a nationwide Spanish radio station opened on 1 February 1982 and closed on 19 June 1994. It served as the basis for the creation of Antena 3 Televisión.

Foundation 

Antena 3 was created on 1 February 1982 by La Vanguardia (51%) and ABC (13%), Manuel Martín Ferrand (5%), Europa Press and Grupo Zeta. The CEO was Manuel Martín Ferrand, and its president was Rafael Jiménez de Parga, later succeeded by  Javier Godó (from La Vanguardia). The general director was Javier Jimeno, the Head of Programs was José Luis Orosa, and José Cavero was head of news.

Goals 

The main goal of Antena 3 was to create a private television channel. That request was rejected in 1982, but then approved in 1989, when Antena 3 Televisión was created, joining both companies of radio and television.

History

Beginnings and consolidation 

Antena 3 started broadcast nationwide on 4 May 1982. In 1984, they acquired Promotora de Televisión y Radio S.A. and its music station Radio 80, which became Radio 8 Serie Oro. On 1991, through Onda Musical S.A. they released another music station, Radiolé. In 1989, they became the first Spanish media company on the stock exchange. On 1992, they went to number 1 on the EGM (3.139.000 listeners, beating Cadena SER with 3.007.000 listeners).

Arrival of PRISA and dismantling 

On 22 July 1992 Prisa, owner of Cadena SER, bought 49% of Inversiones Godó and 51% of Patrielva, and therefore controlled 25% of Antena 3 Radio. At the end of 1992, fulfilling the Television Law, Antena 3 Radio sold their part of Antena 3 Television (12,49%), and therefore, the radio and television companies became independent from each other.

On 1993, PRISA launched an IPO to acquire the share of stock. At the end of 1993, after some business movements, Prisa owned 80% of Antena 3 Radio through the constitution of "Unión Radio". Eight journalists from Antena 3 (Antonio Herrero, Manuel Martín Ferrand, Melchor Miralles, Pedro J. Ramírez, Luis Ángel de la Viuda, Federico Jiménez Losantos, José María García and Luis Herrero) would denounce this operation. The newspaper El País would criticize this denounce.

Meanwhile, in January 1993, Radio 80 (owned by Antena 3) merged with Radio Minuto (owned by Prisa), creating M80 Radio. In May 1994, against the opinion of the Court of Competition, the cabinet council authorized the operation and creation of Unión Radio.

End of transmission 

Therefore, on 19 June 1994, Antena 3 ceased its broadcast as a generalist station, and became "Sinfo Radio Antena 3", which would be dedicated to classic music. In 2000, the Supreme Court outlawed the 1994 operation, but the sentence never was executed. Finally, on 29 March 2002, Sinfo Radio Antena 3 ceased its transmissions and was substituted by Máxima FM, dedicated to dance music.

Former stations and frequencies 
 A Coruña: 92.6 FM (now Radio Voz)
 Albacete: 98.3 FM (now Cadena Dial)
 Alcalá de Henares: 103.1 FM (now Cadena SER)
 Alicante: 91.6 FM (now Cadena SER 91.7 FM)
 Ávila: 94.2 FM (now Cadena SER)
 Almería: 87.9 FM
 Arcos de la Frontera: 88.5 (now Cadena Dial)
 Ayamonte: 93.1 FM (now Cadena SER)
 Badajoz: 93.5 FM (now Cadena Dial)
 Barcelona: 104.2 FM (now Máxima FM)
 Baza: 89.2 FM (now Cadena SER)
 Bilbao: 103.7 FM (now Punto Radio)
 Burgos: 94.3 FM (now Cadena Dial)
 Cadiz: 93.2 FM (now M80 Radio)
 Caravaca de la Cruz: 97.2 FM (now Cadena SER)
 Cartagena("Litoral"): 95.4 FM (now Cadena Dial)
 Castellón: 91.2 FM (now Cadena SER)
 Castro Urdiales: 90.3 FM (now Cadena SER)
 Cieza: 88.0 FM (now Cadena SER)
 Ciudad Real 96.2 FM (now Cadena Dial)
 Córdoba: 88.3 FM (now Cadena Dial 88.4 FM)
 Costa del Sol 93.3 FM (now Cadena SER)
 Don Benito: 98.4 FM (now los 40 Principales)
 Elche : 101.4 FM (now Radio Expres Elche)
 Gandia: 104.3 FM (now Cadena SER)
 Haro: 100.7 FM (now Cadena SER)
 Las Palmas: 103.0 FM (now Radio Canarias)
 León: 94.3 FM (now Cadena Dial)
 Madrid: 104.3 FM (now Máxima FM)
 Mallorca: 103.2 FM (now Cadena SER)
 Medina del Campo: 89.2 FM (now Cadena SER)
 Menorca: 98.2 FM (now Cadena Dial)
 Mérida: 100.0 FM
 Mojacar:91.8 FM (now Cadena SER)
 Monòver: 102.4 (now Radio Ciudad)
 Murcia: 100.3 FM (now Cadena SER)
 Oviedo: 91.1 FM (now Cadena Dial)
 Palencia: 94.7 FM (now Los 40 Principales)
 Parla("Madrid Sur"): 94.4 FM (now Cadena SER)
 Pontevedra: 93.1 FM (now Radio Voz)
 Reus: 95.3 FM (now Onda Cero)
 Ronda: 88.9 FM (now Cadena Dial)
 San Sebastián: 106.2 (now Punto Radio)
 Santander: 101.1 FM (now M80 Radio)
 Segovia: 94.8 FM (now Cadena Dial)
 Sevilla: 101.5 FM (now Radiolé)
 Soria: 97.7 FM (now Los 40 Principales)
 Tarragona: 96.2 FM (now M80 Radio, 96.1 FM)
 Tenerife: 91.1 FM (now Máxima FM)
 Toledo: 94,2 FM (now los 40 principales)
 Tortosa: 101.9 FM (now Radio Marca)
 Tudela 90.4 FM (now Cadena SER)
 Valencia: 100.4 FM (now Cadena SER)
 Valladolid: 100.4 FM (now Cadena Dial)
 Vilafranca del Penedès: 92.6 FM (now Cadena SER, later 103.1 FM SER PENEDÈS-GARRAF)
 Vitoria: 105.6 FM (now Punto Radio)
 Xàtiva: 94.6 FM (now Cadena SER)
 Zamora: 103.1 FM (now Cadena SER)
 Zaragoza: 92.0 FM (now Máxima FM)

People who worked on Antena 3 Radio 

 Antonio Herrero
 José María García
 Gaspar Rosety
 Fernando Soria
 Eduardo Torrico
 Ernesto López Feito
 Andrés Montes
 Paco Galindo
 Manuel Martín Ferrand
 Javier Godó
 Luis Herrero
 Federico Jiménez Losantos
 Miguel Ángel García Juez
 José Antonio Plaza
 Miguel Ángel Nieto González
 Isabel González del Vado
 Rafael Jiménez de Parga
 Santiago Amón
 Luis Ángel de la Viuda
 Víctor Márquez Reviriego
 Carlos de Prada
 Luis Vicente Muñoz
 José Luis Balbín
 Carlos Pumares
 José Ramón Pardo
 José Cavero
 Nieves Herrero
 Rosa Villacastín
 Mayra Gómez Kemp
 Juan Luis Cano
 Guillermo Fesser
 Bartolomé Beltrán
 Ana Rosa Quintana
 Luis Carandell
 Luis Fraga Pombo
 Alfonso Arús
 Miguel Martínez Fernández
 Tino Pertierra
 Consuelo Berlanga
 Moncho Alpuente
 Julián Lago
 Carlos García Hirschfeld
 Javier Cárdenas
 Ramiro Calle
 Jesús María Amilibia
 Carmen Pérez Novo
 Lydia Lozano
 Consuelo Sánchez-Vicente
 Javier Monjas
 Belén G. del Pino
 Jesús Ortiz Álvarez (Father of Letizia, Princess of Asturias)
 José Luis Garci
 Carmela Castelló
 Javier Jimeno
 Joaquín Hurtado
 Emiliano Aláiz
 José Luis Orosa
 Salomón Hachuel
 Hilario Pino
 Javier González Ferrari
 Carlos Alsina
 Carlos Carnicero
 Consuelo Álvarez de Toledo
 José Luis Pécker
 Nacho Dogan
 Paco Fuentes
 Fernando González Urbaneja
 Víctor Padrón
 Mon Santiso
 Esmeralda Velasco
 Liborio García
 Concha García Campoy
 José María Carrascal
 Justo Braga Suárez
 Alipio Gutiérrez
 Silvia Salgado Garrido
 Alfonso Ortuño
 Pepe Navarro
 Andrés Caparrós Martínez
 Teresa Viejo
 Justo Fernández
 Paco Costas
 Juana Ginzo
 Josemi Rodríguez-Sieiro
 José Manuel Estrada
 Ernesto Sáenz de Buruaga
 Gerardo Lombardero
 Fernando Olmeda
 Eduardo Inda
 Arantza Martín
 Manuel Marlasca
 Rafael Benedito
 Eduardo Alcalde Clemente
 Salvador Valero
 Benito Castro Galiana
 Jesús Saiz Olmo
 Cristina Aguirre
 Rafael Cerro
 Julián Nieto

References

Defunct radio stations in Spain
Radio stations established in 1982
Radio stations disestablished in 1994
1982 establishments in Spain
1994 disestablishments in Spain